FIRE (Flyby of Io with Repeat Encounters) is a concept mission to Jupiter's innermost major moon Io. The mission was first presented in 2012 for a possible future consideration by NASA's New Frontiers program.

Overview

If developed in the future, the FIRE spacecraft would use three gravity assists to reach Jupiter six years later. The ten flybys would be completed in approximately four months.

As a New Frontiers class mission, the cost cap would be $991 million (FY2012) with a $927 million base cap with a $64 million launch vehicle cost credit.

Goals and objectives

Payload

The instrument suite includes four proposed instruments:  
 Visible OpticaL Camera And Near-infrared Observer (VOLCANO) is a visible/near-infrared imager.
 Multi-Axis Geophysical Magnetometer (MAGMA) is a magnetic instrumentation subpackage.
 Comprehensive AnaLysis of Dust from ERuptions and Atmosphere (CALDERA), is a dust analyzer that would identify the material in the volcanic plumes.
 FieLd Analysis through Radio Exploration (FLARE) is a radio science experiment.

Power

Electric power to the spacecraft and its scientific payload would be generated by three Advanced Stirling Radioisotope Generators (ASRG). ASRG is a radioisotope power system under development at NASA's Glenn Research Center. It uses a Stirling power conversion technology to convert radioactive-decay heat into electricity for use on spacecraft.

See also

Atmosphere of Io
Io Volcano Observer (IVO), a mission concept to Io
Volcanology of Io

References

Missions to Jupiter
Io (moon)
New Frontiers program proposals